Chatteris Abbey in Chatteris in the Isle of Ely,  Cambridgeshire was founded as a monastery for Benedictine nuns in 1016 by Ednoth, Bishop of Dorchester. Before 1310 much of the monastery was destroyed by fire. By the middle of the 14th century, some of the local families appear to have been using the nave of the monastic church as their parochial church.

Never a wealthy abbey, it survived the first wave of closures during the Dissolution of the Monasteries and was finally surrendered to the King's commissioners in 1538, by which time there were eleven nuns in residence. At this date many families still used the abbey church as parochial but this, unusually, did not save it from demolition, the parishioners being transferred to St Peter and St Paul's Church nearby. A range of the cloister buildings survived as part of a mansion known as Park House. This was demolished in 1847 and with the exception of a few wall fragments, the site has now completely vanished beneath streets and housing; the Park Streets of Chatteris mark its boundaries.

References 

 Houses of Benedictine nuns: Abbey of Chatteris, A History of the County of Cambridge and the Isle of Ely: Volume 2 (1948), pp. 220–23.
 Anthony New. 'A Guide to the Abbeys of England And Wales', p109-10. Constable.
 Claire Breay (ed.), The Cartulary of Chatteris Abbey, (Woodbridge: Boydell Press, 1999). xiii + 479 pp.; 8 illustrations. 

Benedictine nunneries in England
Anglo-Saxon monastic houses
Monasteries in Cambridgeshire
1016 establishments in England
11th-century establishments in England
1538 disestablishments in England
Christian monasteries established in the 11th century
Chatteris
Buildings and structures demolished in 1847
Demolished buildings and structures in England